Vinciguerria is a genus of lightfishes, family Phosichthyidae. It is named for Dr. Decio Vinciguerra (1856–1934), an Italian ichthyologist.

Included species
There are currently five extant species recognized in this genus:
 Vinciguerria attenuata (Cocco, 1838) (Slender lightfish)
 Vinciguerria lucetia (Garman, 1899) (Panama lightfish)
 Vinciguerria mabahiss R. K. Johnson & Feltes, 1984
 Vinciguerria nimbaria (D. S. Jordan & T. M. Williams, 1895) (Oceanic lightfish)
 Vinciguerria poweriae (Cocco, 1838) (Power's deep-water bristle-mouth fish)

There are also at least two prehistoric species only known from fossils:
†Vinciguerria merklini (Danilchenko, 1946)
†Vinciguerria orientalis Nam, Ko & Nazarkin, 2019

References 

 
Marine fish genera
Ray-finned fish genera
Taxa named by David Starr Jordan
Taxa named by Barton Warren Evermann